Saskatchewan Beach is a resort village in the Canadian province of Saskatchewan within Census Division No. 6. It is on the shores of Last Mountain Lake in the Rural Municipality of McKillop No. 220.

History 
Saskatchewan Beach incorporated as a resort village on June 16, 1919.

Demographics 

Government 
The Resort Village of Saskatchewan Beach is governed by an elected municipal council and an appointed administrator that meets on the third Saturday of every month. The mayor is Harvey McEwen and its administrator is Sharie Hall.

See also 
List of communities in Saskatchewan
List of municipalities in Saskatchewan
List of resort villages in Saskatchewan
List of villages in Saskatchewan
List of summer villages in Alberta

References

External links 

Resort villages in Saskatchewan
McKillop No. 220, Saskatchewan
Division No. 6, Saskatchewan